Sosibius (lived 3rd century BC) was a Tarentine, one of the captains of the body-guards of Ptolemy Philadelphus (283–246 BC), king of Egypt. It is not improbable he may have been the father of Sosibius, minister of Ptolemy Philopator (221–204 BC).

References

Notes

Ancient Tarantines
Ptolemaic generals
3rd-century BC Greek people